Atana is a musical scale.

Atana may also refer to:

Atana, village in Aksy District, Kyrgyzstan
Atana (monarch), ruler of Hariphunchai, Thailand
At(h)ana Potinija, a Mycenaean term from Linear B tablets that may be an early reference to the  goddess Athena

See also
Atanas, given name